Lophostachys villosa is a plant native to the Cerrado vegetation of Brazil. This plant is cited in Flora Brasiliensis, by Carl Friedrich Philipp von Martius.

References
Lophostachys villosa is cited in the following text:
 PILZ, C. S. (2001) A framework for integrating phytoremediation into the landscape architectural design process.

External links
  Flora Brasiliensis: Lophostachys villosa

villosa
Flora of Brazil